Strikeforce: Nashville was a mixed martial arts event produced by Strikeforce, it took place on  April 17, 2010, at the Bridgestone Arena in Nashville, Tennessee, United States and broadcast domestically on CBS.

Background
The main event was originally rumored to be Fedor Emelianenko taking on Fabrício Werdum. However, the fight was moved to a future event.

Bobby Lashley was expected to fight on the card, as the promotion had already submitted an opponent for Lashley and was awaiting  from the Tennessee Athletic Commission. According to Strikeforce CEO Scott Coker, the bout would likely be the fourth bout on the CBS televised portion of the event. On April 5, Lashley confirmed that he would not appear on the card since Strikeforce officials could not guarantee an appearance on the televised portion of the card due to time constraints.

The event drew an estimated 2,900,000 viewers on CBS.

Nashville brawl
The event was marred by a post-fight brawl following the main event. During Jake Shields' post-fight interview, Jason Miller gained access to the cage and interrupted Shields, asking, "Where's my rematch, buddy?" After both Gilbert Melendez and Shields pushed Miller away, Nick Diaz then threw the initial punch to start the full-scale brawl. Members of the Cesar Gracie Jiu-Jitsu camp, including Melendez, Nick and Nate Diaz attacked Miller, while Miller was restrained on the canvas by members of Diaz's camp. The fight was then broken up by referees, members of Dan Henderson's corner and members of security. The brawl resulted in CBS cancelling its half of Strikeforce's television contract: MMA would not return to network television until November 2011 with UFC on Fox: Velasquez vs. Dos Santos.

Results

See also
 Strikeforce (mixed martial arts)
 List of Strikeforce champions
 List of Strikeforce events
 2010 in Strikeforce

References

External links
 

Nashville
2010 in mixed martial arts
Mixed martial arts in Tennessee
Events in Nashville, Tennessee
Sports competitions in Nashville, Tennessee
2010 in sports in Tennessee